The 12th parallel south is a circle of latitude that is 12 degrees south of the Earth's equatorial plane. It crosses the Atlantic Ocean, Africa, the Indian Ocean, Australasia, the Pacific Ocean and South America.

Around the world
Starting at the Prime Meridian and heading eastwards, the parallel 12° south passes through:

{| class="wikitable plainrowheaders"
! scope="col" width="125" | Co-ordinates
! scope="col" | Country, territory or sea
! scope="col" | Notes
|-
| style="background:#b0e0e6;" | 
! scope="row" style="background:#b0e0e6;" | Atlantic Ocean
| style="background:#b0e0e6;" |
|-
| 
! scope="row" | 
|
|-
| 
! scope="row" | 
|
|-valign="top"
| 
! scope="row" | 
| For about 
|-
| 
! scope="row" | 
|
|-valign="top"
| 
! scope="row" | 
|
|-
| 
! scope="row" | 
|
|-
| 
! scope="row" | 
|
|-valign="top"
| style="background:#b0e0e6;" | 
! scope="row" style="background:#b0e0e6;" | Lake Malawi
| style="background:#b0e0e6;" | Passing just north of Chizumulu Island and Likoma Island, 
|-
| 
! scope="row" | 
|
|-valign="top"
| style="background:#b0e0e6;" | 
! scope="row" style="background:#b0e0e6;" | Indian Ocean
| style="background:#b0e0e6;" | Mozambique Channel - Passing just south of Grande Comore island,  - Passing just north of Anjouan island, 
|-
| 
! scope="row" | 
|
|-valign="top"
| style="background:#b0e0e6;" | 
! scope="row" style="background:#b0e0e6;" | Indian Ocean
| style="background:#b0e0e6;" | Passing between North Keeling Island and Horsburgh Island,  Passing just north of the Ashmore and Cartier Islands and Hibernia Reef,  
|-valign="top"
| style="background:#b0e0e6;" | 
! scope="row" style="background:#b0e0e6;" | Timor Sea
| style="background:#b0e0e6;" | Passing south of Bathurst Island,  Passing through the Clarence Strait - between Melville Island and the mainland,  Passing through Van Diemen Gulf
|-
| 
! scope="row" | 
| Arnhem Land, Northern Territory
|-
| style="background:#b0e0e6;" | 
! scope="row" style="background:#b0e0e6;" | Arafura Sea
| style="background:#b0e0e6;" | Bocaut Bay
|-
| 
! scope="row" | 
| Arnhem Land, Northern Territory
|-
| style="background:#b0e0e6;" | 
! scope="row" style="background:#b0e0e6;" | Arafura Sea
| style="background:#b0e0e6;" | Castlereagh Bay - passing just south of Mooroongga Island, 
|-
| 
! scope="row" | 
| Elcho Island and Arnhem Land (mainland), Northern Territory
|-
| style="background:#b0e0e6;" | 
! scope="row" style="background:#b0e0e6;" | Arafura Sea
| style="background:#b0e0e6;" |
|-
| 
! scope="row" | 
| Inglis Island and Arnhem Land (mainland), Northern Territory
|-
| style="background:#b0e0e6;" | 
! scope="row" style="background:#b0e0e6;" | Gulf of Carpentaria
| style="background:#b0e0e6;" |
|-
| 
! scope="row" | 
| Cape York Peninsula, Queensland
|-valign="top"
| style="background:#b0e0e6;" | 
! scope="row" style="background:#b0e0e6;" | Coral Sea
| style="background:#b0e0e6;" | Passing just south of Vanatinai island,  Passing just south of Rennell Island,  Passing just south of Vanikoro island, 
|-
| style="background:#b0e0e6;" | 
! scope="row" style="background:#b0e0e6;" | Pacific Ocean
| style="background:#b0e0e6;" | Passing just north of Tikopia island, 
|-
| 
! scope="row" | 
| Passing just north of Lima
|-
| 
! scope="row" | 
|
|-valign="top"
| 
! scope="row" | 
| Rondônia Mato Grosso Tocantins Bahia
|-
| style="background:#b0e0e6;" | 
! scope="row" style="background:#b0e0e6;" | Atlantic Ocean
| style="background:#b0e0e6;" |
|}

See also
11th parallel south
13th parallel south

s12